Macrophycis is a genus of snout moths described by Rolf-Ulrich Roesler in 1982.

Species
 Macrophycis alluaudella (Viette, 1964)
 Macrophycis ambrella (Viette, 1964)
 Macrophycis malazella (Viette, 1964)

References

Phycitinae